"Salva Mea" (faux Latin for "save me") is a song by British electronic band Faithless, written by members Rollo, Sister Bliss, and Maxi Jazz. The female vocals on all versions are performed by Rollo's sister Dido. "Salva Mea" was released in 1995 as the group's first single and became a hit on the UK Dance Singles Chart; following a re-release in 1996, it peaked at number nine on the UK Singles Chart. The single topped the US Hot Dance Club Play chart twice—during its first chart run in 1996 and again in 1997 when the track was remixed and reissued.

Critical reception
In a retrospective review of the Reverence album, Justin Chadwick from Albumism commented, "While “Insomnia” is phenomenal, it was primarily the epic grandeur and sinister soundscape of “Salva Mea” that blew me away and made me fall madly in love with Faithless’ transcendent sound. Among the group’s myriad standout songs, it’s still my most beloved." Upon the 1995 release, Alan Jones from Music Week called it "the piece de résistance" of the album, noting that "the severely under-rated single" marked Rollo as "the Jim Steinman of dance music." In 1996, a reviewer from the magazine rated it three out of five, adding that "this pizzicato synth-driven floorfiller, with its distinctive changes in tempo and vocals, should emulate their recent number three hit Insomnia." Jones said, "Finally, the inevitable has happened and Faithless's finest recording Salva Mea is back with even more new mixes. As far over the top as Rollo & Sister Bliss have ever got, it's an epic tune and every inch a Top 10 hit."

Music video
A black-and-white music video was produced to promote the single, directed by British director Lindy Heymann.

Track listings

 UK CD 1995
 "Salva Mea" (Slow Version) – 4:11
 "Salva Mea" (Epic Mix) – 11:51
 "Salva Mea" (Tuff Mix) – 9:37
 "Salva Mea" (Sister Bliss Remix) – 8:43

 Australian CD 1996
 "Salva Mea" (Tuff Edit) – 4:02
 "Salva Mea" (Epic Edit) – 4:51
 "Salva Mea" (Radio Version) – 4:08
 "Salva Mea" (Epic Mix) – 11:50
 "Salva Mea" (Tuff Mix) – 9:33
 "Salva Mea" (Sister Bliss Remix) – 8:42
 "Salva Mea" (Floating Mix) – 8:11

 German CD 1996
 "Salva Mea" (Radio Edit) – 3:47
 "Salva Mea" (C.E.C. Edit) – 4:59
 "Salva Mea" (Epic Edit) – 4:51
 "Salva Mea" (96 Remix) – 9:11
 "Salva Mea" (Way Out West Remix) – 7:48
 "Salva Mea" (Tuff Mix) – 8:36

 US CD 1996
 "Salva Mea" (Radio Version) – 4:08
 "Salva Mea" (Epic Radio Version) – 4:51
 "Salva Mea" (Epic Mix) – 11:48
 "Salva Mea" (Tuff Mix) – 9:35
 "Salva Mea" (Sister Bliss Remix) – 8:40

 UK CD 1 – 1997
 "Salva Mea" (Radio Edit) – 4:36
 "Salva Mea" (Epic Mix) – 11:51
 "Salva Mea" (Way Out West Remix) – 7:48
 "Salva Mea" (Slow Version) – 4:10
 "Salva Mea" (Floating Mix) – 8:12

 UK CD 2 – 1997
 "Salva Mea" (Radio Edit) – 4:36
 "Salva Mea" (Epic Mix) – 11:51
 "Salva Mea" (Sister Bliss Mix) – 8:43
 "Salva Mea" (DJ Quicksilver Remix) – 6:52
 "Salva Mea" (Tuff Mix) – 7:57

Charts

Weekly charts

Year-end charts

Release history

References

1995 singles
1995 songs
1996 singles
1997 singles
Black-and-white music videos
Cheeky Records singles
Faithless songs
Music videos directed by Lindy Heymann
Number-one singles in Switzerland
Songs written by Maxi Jazz
Songs written by Rollo Armstrong
Songs written by Sister Bliss